MORE is an outline processor application that was created for the Macintosh in 1986 by software developer Dave Winer and that was not ported to any other platforms. An earlier outliner, ThinkTank, was developed by  Winer, his brother Peter, and Doug Baron for Apple II, Apple III, PC and then ported by Peter to the Macintosh.

MORE was the result of combining three planned products into one expanding around the outliner, and described by its author as an outline processor. In MORE, the outlines could be formatted with different layouts, colors, and shapes. Outline "nodes" could include pictures and graphics.

The company that made these products, Living Videotext, merged with Symantec in July 1987. Around July 1999, with Symantec's permission, Mr. Winer released versions of the ThinkTank and MORE products on a Web site for free download.

Functions

In 1987, MORE had evolved into a tool that was used to create presentations, a category that ultimately would be dominated by PowerPoint when Microsoft chose to pass up on acquiring Living Videotext.

Functions in these outliners included:
 Appending notes, comments, rough drafts of sentences and paragraphs under some topics
 Assembling various low-level topics and creating a new topic to group them under
 Deleting duplicate topics
 Demoting a topic to become a subtopic under some other topic
 Disassembling a grouping that does not work, parceling its subtopics out among various other topics
 Dividing one topic into its component subtopics
 Dragging to rearrange the order of topics
 Making a hierarchical list of topics
 Merging related topics
 Promoting a subtopic to the level of a topic

Reception
MORE was selected for the 2nd Annual Editor's Choice awards of the magazine MacUser as Best Organizer and Best Product of 1986.

References

 Price, Jonathan (October 19–22, 1997) How Electronic Outlining Can Help You Create Online Materials Retrieved April 17, 2016

External links
 Outliners.com Archived information by Dave Winer
 How Electronic Outlining Can Help You Create Online Materials at The Communication Circle

Classic Mac OS word processors
Classic Mac OS-only software
Outliners
Presentation software
1986 software